Annaye Atyachar is a 2004 Bengali action drama film directed by Swapan Saha and produced by  Manju Dhanuka. The film features actors Prosenjit Chatterjee and Rachana Banerjee in the lead roles. The music in the film was composed by Saikat Ali Iman.

Cast 
 Prosenjit Chatterjee 
 Rachana Banerjee
 Jisshu Sengupta
 Laboni Sarkar
 Abdur Razzak
 Nirmal Kumar
 Subhendu Chatterjee
 Rishi Mukherjee
 Moumita Chakraborty
 Manjusree Gangopadhyay

Production
This movie was a remake of Maa Jokhon Bicharok directed by Shohanur Rahman Sohan.

Soundtrack

References 

Bengali-language Indian films
2004 films
2000s Bengali-language films
Films directed by Swapan Saha
Indian action drama films